In Turkey, the Directorate of National Palaces is an institution responsible for protecting national palaces across the country. It is affiliated with the office of the President of Turkey.

History 
Four months after the declaration of the Republic of Turkey, with the Law No. 431 enacted on 3 March 1924, the Caliphate was abolished, and the sultan's palaces and all its properties and furnishings were transferred to the nation according to Articles 8, 9 and 10 of this law.

With the Council of Ministers' decree on 18 January 1925, Dolmabahçe and Beylerbeyi Palaces were named among the National Palaces and left to the management of the National Palaces Managing Organization. In the same year, Yıldız-Şale, Aynalıkavak and Küçüksu Palace came under the control of this Directorate, followed by Yalova Atatürk Mansion in 1930, Ihlamur Palace in 1966 and Maslak Palace in 1981. With the Organization Law of the General Secretariat of the Turkish Grand National Assembly numbered 2919, the organization became an independent department on its own and in 1988 the Florya Atatürk Marine Mansion was added to the list of properties controlled by it, followed by Filizli Mansion in 1991, and Yıldız Porcelain and Hereke İpekli Weaving and Carpet Factories in 1994. On 10 July 2018, the institution was connected to the Office of President with the Presidential Decree No. 1 and its name was changed to the "Directorate of National Palaces".

Palaces and properties 
 Aynalıkavak Pavilion
 Beylerbeyi Palace
 Çırağan Palace
 Dolmabahçe Palace
 Filizli Mansion
 Florya Atatürk Marine Mansion
 Hereke İpekli Weaving and Carpet Factory
 Ihlamur Pavilion
 Küçüksu Pavilion
 Maslak Pavilion
 Yalova Atatürk Mansion
 Yıldız Porcelain Factory
 Yıldız Palace

References 

Government agencies of Turkey